Admiral Sir Frederic Edward Errington Brock,  (15 October 1854 – 1 November 1929) was a Royal Navy officer.

Naval career
Brock was promoted to lieutenant in the Royal Navy on 8 December 1879. Promoted to captain on 30 June 1898, he was given command of the protected cruiser HMS Highflyer in December 1899, and was thus flag captain to rear-admiral Day Bosanquet during his years as Commander-in-Chief of the East Indies Station. He transferred to a temporary command of the second-class battleship HMS Camperdown for a month from 24 September to 7 November 1902, before he was appointed in command of the armoured cruiser HMS Bacchante on 25 November 1902, for her outbound journey to her first commission in the Mediterranean Squadron. On arrival she replaced  as flagship of its cruiser squadron, and Brock changed places on 20 December with Captain Christopher Cradock, who had until then been in command of Andromeda. Brock then brought the Andromeda home, and paid her off on 10 February 1903. He was later given command of the protected cruiser HMS Diadem in July 1903, followed by command of the armoured cruiser HMS Donegal in November 1903, before transferring to the battleship HMS Triumph in May 1905.

Brock became Rear-Admiral Commanding the Portsmouth Division of the Home Fleet in November 1909, Senior Naval Officer at Gibraltar in September 1912 and, during the First World War, Admiral Commanding, Orkneys and Shetlands in January 1916.

References

Royal Navy admirals
1854 births
1929 deaths
Knights Grand Cross of the Order of the British Empire
Knights Commander of the Order of St Michael and St George
Companions of the Order of the Bath